Diploderma micangshanense is a species of lizard native to China.

References 

Diploderma
Reptiles of China
Reptiles described in 1987
Taxobox binomials not recognized by IUCN